The 2021–22 season is Stevenage's eighth consecutive season in League Two and their 46th year in existence. Along with competing in League Two, the club are also participating in the FA Cup, the EFL Cup and the EFL Trophy. The season covers the period from 1 July 2021 to 30 June 2022. Manager Alex Revell left the club on 15 November 2021 with the club having won three of their opening 16 league matches. Academy manager Robbie O’Keefe was named as caretaker manager while the club looked for a replacement. Paul Tisdale was appointed as manager on 28 November 2021. Stevenage and Tisdale parted ways on March 16, 2022, with Steve Evans taking charge as manager.

Pre-season friendlies
Stevenage announced they would play pre-season friendlies against Hitchin Town, St Albans City, Wycombe Wanderers, Ipswich Town, Crystal Palace under-23s, Watford and Dover Athletic as part of their pre-season preparations.

Competitions

League Two

League table

Results summary

Results by matchday

Matches
Stevenage's league fixtures were revealed on 24 June 2021.

FA Cup

Stevenage were drawn away to Milton Keynes Dons in the first round and Yeovil Town in the second round.

EFL Cup

Stevenage were drawn at home to Luton Town in the first round and Wycombe Wanderers in the second round.

EFL Trophy

Stevenage were drawn into Southern Group H alongside Cambridge United, Oxford United and Tottenham Hotspur under-21s. Dates for the group stage fixtures were announced on 7 July 2021.

Transfers

Transfers in

Loans in

Loans out

Transfers out

Statistics

Appearances and goals

Last updated 31 August 2021.

|-
! colspan=14 style=background:#dcdcdc; text-align:center| Goalkeepers

|-

! colspan=14 style=background:#dcdcdc; text-align:center| Defenders

|-

! colspan=14 style=background:#dcdcdc; text-align:center| Midfielders

|-

! colspan=14 style=background:#dcdcdc; text-align:center| Forwards

|}

Top scorers
Includes all competitive matches. The list is sorted by squad number when total goals are equal.

Last updated 31 August 2021.

Clean sheets
Includes all competitive matches. The list is sorted by squad number when total clean sheets are equal.

Last updated 31 August 2021.

Disciplinary record
Includes all competitive matches.

Last updated 31 August 2021.

References

Stevenage
Stevenage F.C. seasons